Keith David Boyce (11 October 1943 – 11 October 1996) was a cricketer who played 21 Tests and 8 One Day Internationals for the West Indies between 1971 and 1976. He died from the effects of chronic cirrhosis of the liver, while sitting in a chair at a pharmacist's in Speightstown, Barbados, on his birthday on 11 October 1996.

Boyce was the first man to take eight wickets in a List A match; he achieved the feat when he took 8–26 for Essex against Lancashire in 1971. No other player dismissed eight batsmen in a one-day innings until Kent's Derek Underwood claimed 8–31 against Scotland sixteen years later.

Boyce's finest moment in Test cricket came in the First Test of the 1973 tour of England, when he scored 72, and took 5/70 and 6/77 in a 158-run victory.  His highest Test score of 95 not out came in his penultimate Test, at Adelaide in January 1976.

Boyce had been recruited for Essex by Trevor Bailey. In the first innings of his Essex debut against Cambridge University in 1966 he took 9 for 61, which turned out to be the best bowling figures of his career.  In that innings, Boyce's future West Indies teammate Deryck Murray scored 58 (not out) in the university's total of 127.  Boyce's highest innings of 147 not out came against Hampshire at Ilford in 1969.

In 1974 Boyce was named one of the Wisden Cricketers of the Year.  Following an injury, he returned to his home island of Barbados, where he suffered several personal setbacks.  He was married twice, and had two daughters.

References

External links
 Keith Boyce at Cricket Archive
 Keith Boyce at Cricinfo

Barbadian cricketers
West Indies Test cricketers
West Indies One Day International cricketers
Barbados cricketers
Commonwealth XI cricketers
Essex cricketers
International Cavaliers cricketers
Wisden Cricketers of the Year
Cricketers at the 1975 Cricket World Cup
1943 births
1996 deaths
Marylebone Cricket Club cricketers
People from Saint Peter, Barbados
T. N. Pearce's XI cricketers